
Year 439 (CDXXXIX) was a common year starting on Sunday (link will display the full calendar) of the Julian calendar. At the time, it was known as the Year of the Consulship of Theodosius and Festus (or, less frequently, year 1192 Ab urbe condita). The denomination 439 for this year has been used since the early medieval period, when the Anno Domini calendar era became the prevalent method in Europe for naming years.

Events 
 By place 

 Europe 
 Battle of Guoloph: Vitalinus (possibly Vortigern) is defeated at the hands of Ambrosius Aurelianus, and a combined force of Romano-British forces from across southern Britain.
 Litorius, Roman general (Magister militum per Gallias), lays siege to Toulouse. During the decisive battle before the walls he suffers a severe defeat and is killed, and only the heavy loss of Visigoths makes King Theodoric I decide to agree to a provisional restoration of the status quo.
 Licinia Eudoxia, wife of emperor Valentinian III, is granted the title of Augusta following the birth of their daughter Eudocia.

 Byzantium 
 Winter – Hun and Roman envoys meet at Margum (modern Bosnia and Herzegovina), an important market town on the Sava River. After negotiations, Attila and his brother Bleda, who are present, accept a four-point peace plan. Trading rights between the two states are confirmed and emperor Theodosius II pays an annual tribute of 700 pounds of gold.

 Africa 

 King Genseric breaks his treaty with the Western Roman Empire and invades Africa Proconsularis.
 October 19 – Carthage falls to the Vandals. Genseric makes it his capital and establishes the Vandal Kingdom.
 The Vandals establish a North African granary that enables them to enforce their will on other nations, who are dependent on North Africa for grain and other food staples.

 By topic 

 Religion 
 Isaac the Great, Armenian apostolic patriarch, dies at Ashtishat. He helped to develop a Greek-inspired alphabet, and translate the Bible, along with various Christian writings, into Armenian.
 The Historia Ecclesiastica of Socrates of Constantinople is concluded, perhaps due to the author's death.
 The monastery of Mar Saba is founded near Bethlehem (Palestine).

Births 
 Eudocia, Vandal queen and daughter of Valentinian III
 Ming Di, emperor of the Liu Song Dynasty (d. 472)
 Sabbas the Sanctified, Christian monk and saint (d. 532)

Deaths 
 Isaac, patriarch of Armenia (b. 338)
 Litorius, general of the Western Roman Empire
 Sima Maoying, empress of the Liu Song Dynasty (b. 393)   
 Spearthrower Owl, ruler of Teotihuacan (Mexico)

References